Secondary electrons are electrons generated as ionization products. They are called 'secondary' because they are generated by other radiation (the primary radiation). This radiation can be in the form of ions, electrons, or photons with sufficiently high energy, i.e. exceeding the ionization potential. Photoelectrons can be considered an example of secondary electrons where the primary radiation are photons; in some discussions photoelectrons with higher energy (>50 eV) are still considered "primary" while the electrons freed by the photoelectrons are "secondary".

Applications
Secondary electrons are also the main means of viewing images in the scanning electron microscope (SEM). The range of secondary electrons depends on the energy. Plotting the inelastic mean free path as a function of energy often shows characteristics of the "universal curve"  familiar to electron spectroscopists and surface analysts. This distance is on the order of a few nanometers in metals and tens of nanometers in insulators. This small distance allows such fine resolution to be achieved in the SEM.

For SiO2, for a primary electron energy of 100 eV, the secondary electron range is up to 20 nm from the point of incidence.

See also
Delta ray
Everhart-Thornley detector

References

Electron states
Ions